Tenellia hamanni is a species of sea slug, an aeolid nudibranch, a marine gastropod mollusc in the family Fionidae.

Distribution
This species was described from La Jolla, California.

Description
The typical adult size of this species is 14 mm.

References

Fionidae
Gastropods described in 1987